Daniel Anthony (born 4 October 1987) is a British actor. He is known for his regular roles as Clyde Langer in the Doctor Who spin-off series The Sarah Jane Adventures (2007–2011) and as Jamie Collier in the medical drama Casualty (2013–2014).

Early life and inspiration 
Anthony was born on 4 October 1987 in Quinton, Birmingham. He was a shy and socially awkward boy, so his mother sent him to a drama club in South London to bring him out of myself. He fell in love with acting right away and was soon noticed and signed up by the talent agency that owned the club.

Anthony cites Will Smith's performance in the sitcom The Fresh Prince of Bel-Air (1990–1996) as his early inspiration for acting.

Career 
He started his career as a child actor, appearing in several West End musicals, including the original production of The Lion King (1999) as young Simba, and Sam Mendes's revival of Oliver! (1994) at the London Palladium. On stage, he has also played Curtis Younger in the Young Vic's A Raisin in the Sun (2001) and Pip in Moby-Dick (2006). In 2003, he voiced Will Parry in the BBC Radio 4 production of the His Dark Materials trilogy.

His early television roles include JJ in EastEnders (2004), Lex Keavey in Doctors (2006), and Danny in As the Bell Rings (2007). For his performance in Doctors, he was nominated for a British Soap Award for Best Newcomer and longlisted for Villain of the Year.

In 2008, he appeared as Kez in Dis/Connected, a BBC Three drama pilot about a young girl committing suicide and the impact it has on her friends. He then made a brief appearance as a thug in the ITV drama Demons (2009), and played Jack in the BBC musical film Rules of Love (2010) about a boy from the wrong side of town (Jake Roche) and an ambitious boarding school girl (Daisy Head).

From 2013 to 2014, he was a regular in the medical drama Casualty, playing Jamie Collier, the nephew of already established character Jeff. He has described his character as "the calm one, the voice of reason". He then starred as Royston Peel in the crime drama Brotherhood (2016). In 2021, he joined the UK touring cast of Magic Goes Wrong in the role of Mickey.

The Sarah Jane Adventures 
He appeared as a series regular in the Doctor Who spin-off series The Sarah Jane Adventures from 2007 to 2011, playing Clyde Langer. Speaking about his character, Anthony said, "I would describe Clyde as the joker of the group. He always has an answer for everything, even though 99% of the time it was probably wrong! I really enjoy playing comedy so, for me, this character was a dream". He has also narrated The Sarah Jane Adventures audiobook Children of Steel (2011), written by Martin Day, and briefly reprised his role in the 2020 webcast mini episode "Farewell, Sarah Jane", aired on Doctor Who social media channels as a tribute to Elisabeth Sladen.

In 2022, it was announced that Big Finish Productions would produce an audio spin-off of The Sarah Jane Adventures, Beyond Bannerman Road: Rani Takes on the World, set 15 years after the events of the series and focusing on Anthony and Anjli Mohindra's characters. He previously played Delong in the Big Finish Doctor Who audio story "Wirrn Dawn" (2009), starring Paul McGann as the Eighth Doctor, and Julian Delaware in the Torchwood audio story "The Law Machines" (2018). With his role of Delong, he became the first regular actor from the BBC Wales-produced Doctor Who-related series to have participated in a Big Finish production.

Filmography

Television

Film

Stage

Audio

Video games

Awards and nominations
 2006: Nominated for a British Soap Award for Best Newcomer for Doctors
 2006: Longlisted for a British Soap Award for Villain of the Year for Doctors

References

External links
 
 Agent's Page

1987 births
Living people
21st-century English male actors
Black British male actors
English male musical theatre actors
English male radio actors
English male television actors
English male voice actors
English male video game actors
English people of Sierra Leonean descent
Male actors from Birmingham, West Midlands